The Russian Rhythmic Gymnastics National Championship is an annual rhythmic gymnastics national competition in Russia.

History
The Russian Gymnastics Federation of the Russian Soviet Federative Socialist Republic was established in 1963. For many years, it was a division of the Rhythmic Gymnastics Federation of the USSR that contributed to the development of gymnastics in the RSFSR as an independent sport by strengthening its financial base, improving the methods and practice of the training process, and facilitating the growth of the sport.

The "Russian Rhythmic Gymnastics Federation" (abbreviated VFHG) is a Russian public organization.  The federation held their inaugural conference on September 12, 1991, in Ivanovo, and was officially registered with the Ministry of Justice of the RSFSR on January 9, 1992.

Changes and additions to the Charter Conference VFHG were approved on February 16, 1999. The Ministry of Justice of the Russian Federation VFHG issued a new certificate of registration on August 12, 1999.

Russian Championships Medalists
Competitions preceding 1992 were held before the breakup of the USSR as Soviet Championships.

Russian Junior medalists

References

External links
 Official Website
 Rhythmic Gymnastics Results
 Fédération Internationale de Gymnastique

 

 
Russian
Gymnastics competitions in Russia
Rhythmic gymnastics